Bang Yai may refer to:

Bang Yai District in Nonthaburi Province, Thailand
Bang Yai Subdistrict, Nonthaburi, within the district
Sao Thong Hin, a municipality and subdistrict within the district, and its current administrative centre, the area of which is commonly referred to as Bang Yai
Sam Yaek Bang Yai MRT station, which serves the area
Talad Bang Yai MRT station, which also serves the area